Pyotr Nikolayev (18 April 1924 – 2000) was a Soviet sports shooter. He competed in the 100 m running deer event at the 1952 Summer Olympics.

Personal life
Nikolayev served in the Soviet Army as a squad leader during the Second World War. He was awarded the Medal "For Courage" and Medal "For the Victory over Germany in the Great Patriotic War 1941–1945".

References

1924 births
2000 deaths
Soviet male sport shooters
Olympic shooters of the Soviet Union
Shooters at the 1952 Summer Olympics
Sportspeople from Irkutsk
Soviet military personnel of World War II
Recipients of the Medal "For Courage" (Russia)